is a Japanese drama film directed by Yoshitaka Mori, starring Kenichi Matsuyama and based on the novel of the same name by Yoshio Ōsaki. By the first screenings, the film had earned ¥72 million (US$0.662 million).

Plot
The film portrays the life of Satoshi Murayama (1969-1998), who was a professional shogi player.

Cast
 Kenichi Matsuyama as Satoshi Murayama
 Masahiro Higashide as Yoshiharu Habu, Satoshi's rival and one of the greatest shogi players of all time.
 Lily Franky as Nobuo Mori, Satoshi's master
 Keiko Takeshita as Tomiko Murayama, Satoshi's mother
 Shōta Sometani as Mitsugu Egawa
 Ken Yasuda as Seiichiro Tachibana (based on Seiichiro Taki)
 Tokio Emoto as Manabu Arazaki (based on Manabu Senzaki)
 Toshiyuki Kitami as Shinichi Murayama, Satoshi's father
 Shingo Tsurumi as a doctor
 Michitaka Tsutsui as Yōji Hashiguchi (based on Yoshio Ōsaki)

Awards

References

External links
 

2016 films
Works about shogi
Films about board games
2010s Japanese films